is an amusement park located next to the Tokyo Dome in Bunkyō, Tokyo, Japan, and forms a part of the Tokyo Dome City entertainment complex. It opened in 1958, and was formerly known as  until April 2003. It was one of the most popular amusement parks in Tokyo. Rides include the Big O Ferris wheel and Thunder Dolphin roller coaster.

Attractions

LaQua
Big-O (Ferris wheel)
Thunder Dolphin (roller coaster)
Wonder Drop (water slide)
Venus Lagoon (merry-go-round)
The Dive (shooting ride)
Water Symphony (fountain show)

Viking Zone
Super Viking SORABUNE (swinging ship)
Furi Furi Grand Prix (go-cart)
Bun Bun Bee
Carousel
Kids Hacker (mini drop tower)

Splash Garden
Pixie Cup (teacups)
Power Tower
Corocco
Magical Mist

Parachute Zone
Bloom Express
Water Cannons
Flash Rush
Sky Flower
Chapu Chapu Creek
Haunted House

Geopolis
Panic Coaster – Back Daaan
Gangan Butlers
Nin-Nin Land

Other
MagiQuest Mega Kingdom
Super Sentai Hero Action Show

Former attractions

Parachute Zone
Linear Gale (roller coaster)

Geopolis
Tokyo Panic Cruise
Lupin III: Labyrinth Trap

Accidents
 On 29 February 2010, a 26-year-old worker lost three fingers while inspecting the Tower Hacker ride before the park opened in the morning.
 On 5 December 2010, a nine-year-old girl suffered minor injuries after being hit by a bolt which had fallen from the Thunder Dolphin roller coaster.
 On 30 January 2011, a 34-year-old man was killed after falling from the Spinning Coaster Maihime roller coaster at the park.

References

External links
 
 Attractions
 Roller Coaster DataBase

Amusement parks in Japan
1958 establishments in Japan
Buildings and structures in Bunkyō
Tourist attractions in Tokyo
Amusement parks opened in 1958